Reitbrook is a quarter of Hamburg, Germany, in the borough of Bergedorf. It has a population of only 522 people (2020). It is popular for its wind mill.

Geography
Reitbrook borders the quarter Kirchwerder, Ochsenwerder, Neuengamme and Allermöhe. It is located at the Dove Elbe.

Politics
These are the results of Reitbrook in the Hamburg state election:

People from Reitbrook
• Alfred Lichtwark (* 14. November 1852; † 13. January 1914 in Hamburg) his father was the owner of the Reitbrook Mill.

References

Quarters of Hamburg
Bergedorf